Four ships of the Royal Navy have been named HMS Bellerophon after the hero Bellerophon in Greek mythology, whilst another two were planned:
 , nicknamed the "Billy Ruffian", was a 74-gun third rate launched in 1786 that fought at the Battle of Trafalgar in 1805. She became a prison ship in 1815, was renamed HMS Captivity in 1824, and was sold in 1836.
 , was an 80-gun third rate, originally named HMS Talavera but renamed  before her launch in 1818. She was renamed HMS Bellerophon in 1824, relegated to harbour service in 1848. She then saw active service at Sebastopol during the Crimean War 1854–1856. Her gun crews manned off-loaded guns ashore and were nicknamed "The Bellerophon Doves". She sustained some damage during the bombardment of Sebastopol and was finally sold for breaking up in 1892.
  was an ironclad battleship launched in 1865. She was renamed Indus III in 1904 and used for training, and was sold in 1922.
  was a  dreadnought battleship launched in 1907. She saw service in the First World War, including the Battle of Jutland, and was sold for breaking up in 1921.
She was ordered in 1942, but was renamed  before construction started in 1944.
 HMS Bellerophon was to have been a Minotaur-class cruiser. She was renamed  in 1945 whilst under construction and was launched later that year.

See also
HMS Bellerophon, a former Royal Navy shore establishment in Portsmouth, Hampshire, England.

Royal Navy ship names